Cirsium is a genus of perennial and biennial flowering plants in the Asteraceae, one of several genera known commonly as thistles. They are more precisely known as plume thistles.  These differ from other thistle genera (Carduus, Silybum and Onopordum) in having feathered hairs to their achenes.  The other genera have a pappus of simple unbranched hairs.

They are mostly native to Eurasia and northern Africa, with about 60 species from North America (although several species have been introduced outside their native ranges).

Thistles are known for their effusive flower heads, usually purple, rose or pink, also yellow or white. The radially symmetrical disc flowers are at the end of the branches and are visited by many kinds of insects, featuring a generalised pollination syndrome. They have erect stems and prickly leaves, with a characteristic enlarged base of the flower which is commonly spiny. The leaves are alternate, and some species can be slightly hairy. Extensions from the leaf base down the stem, called wings, can be lacking (Cirsium arvense), conspicuous (Cirsium vulgare), or inconspicuous. They can spread by seed, and also by rhizomes below the surface (Cirsium arvense). The seed has tufts of tiny hair, or pappus, which can carry them far by wind.

Cirsium thistles are used as food plants by the larvae of some Lepidoptera species—see list of Lepidoptera that feed on Cirsium. The seeds are attractive to small finches such as American goldfinch.

Most species are considered weeds, typically by agricultural interests. Cirsium vulgare (bull thistle, common thistle, or spear thistle) is listed as a noxious weed in nine US states. Some species in particular are cultivated in gardens and wildflower plantings for their aesthetic value and/or to support pollinators such as butterflies. Some species dubbed weeds by various interest groups can also provide these benefits. Cirsium vulgare, for instance, ranked in the top 10 for nectar production in a UK plants survey conducted by the AgriLand project which is supported by the UK Insect Pollinators Initiative. Cirsium vulgare was also a top producer of nectar sugar in another study in Britain, ranked third with a production per floral unit of (2323 ± 418μg). Not only does it provide abundant nectar, it provides seeds for birds, such as the American goldfinch, Spinus tristis, and supports the larvae of a Painted Lady butterfly, Vanessa cardui. Some other common species are: Cirsium arvense, Cirsium palustre, Cirsium oleraceum. 

Some ecological organizations, such as the Xerces Society, have attempted to raise awareness of the benefits of thistles, to counteract the general agricultural and home garden labeling of thistles as unwanted weeds. The monarch butterfly (Danaus plexippus), for instance, was highlighted as relying upon thistles such as Tall thistle (Cirsium altissimum) as nectar sources during its migration. Although such organizations focus on the benefits of native thistles, non-native thistles, such as Cirsium vulgare in North America, may provide similar benefits to wildlife. Some prairie and wildflower seed production companies supply bulk seed for native North American thistle species, for wildlife habitat restoration, although availability tends to be low. Thistles are particularly valued by bumblebees for their high nectar production.

Certain species of Cirsium, like Cirsium monspessulanum, Cirsium pyrenaicum and Cirsium vulgare, have been traditionally used as food in rural areas of southern Europe. Cirsium oleraceum is cultivated as a food source in Japan and India. Cirsium setidens is used as a vegetable in Korean cuisine.

The word 'Cirsium' derives from the Greek word kirsos meaning 'swollen vein'. Thistles were used as a remedy against swollen veins. The flower blooms April to August.

Selected Species 

Cirsium acarna – soldier thistle
Cirsium acaule – stemless thistle, dwarf thistle
Cirsium altissimum – roadside thistle, tall thistle
Cirsium amblylepis – Mt. Tamalpais thistle
Cirsium andersonii – Anderson's thistle, rose thistle
Cirsium andrewsii – Franciscan thistle
Cirsium arizonicum – Arizona thistle
Cirsium arvense – creeping thistle, field thistle, Canada thistle
Cirsium arvense var.argenteum
Cirsium arvense var. integrifolium
Cirsium arvense var. mite
Cirsium arvense var. vestitum
Cirsium barnebyi – Barneby's thistle
Cirsium brachycephalum
Cirsium brevifolium – Palouse thistle
Cirsium brevistylum – clustered thistle
Cirsium calcareum – Cainville thistle
Cirsium californicum – California thistle
Cirsium callilepis – fringebract thistle
Cirsium campylon – Mount Hamilton thistle
Cirsium canescens – Platte thistle, prairie thistle
Cirsium canovirens – graygreen thistle
Cirsium canum – Queen Anne's thistle
Cirsium carolinianum – Carolina thistle, soft thistle
Cirsium caulescens
Cirsium centaureae
Cirsium chellyense – queen thistle
Cirsium chuskaense – monarch thistle
Cirsium ciliolatum – ashland thistle
Cirsium clavatum – lake thistle
Cirsium clokeyi – Charleston Mountain thistle, whitespine thistle
Cirsium congdonii – rosette thistle
Cirsium costaricense
Cirsium coulteri – Coulter's thistle
Cirsium crassicaule – slough thistle
Cirsium cymosum – peregrine thistle
Cirsium diacanthum
Cirsium discolor – field thistle, pasture thistle
Cirsium dissectum – meadow thistle
Cirsium douglasii
Cirsium drummondii – dwarf thistle
Cirsium durangense
Cirsium eatonii – Eaton's thistle
Cirsium edule – edible thistle
Cirsium engelmannii – Engelmann thistle, Engelmann's thistle
Cirsium eriophorum – woolly thistle
Cirsium erisithales – yellow melancholy thistle
Cirsium esculentum
Cirsium flodmanii – Flodman thistle, Flodman's thistle
Cirsium foliosum – Drummond's thistle, elk thistle, leafy thistle, meadow thistle
Cirsium fontinale – fountain thistle
Cirsium funkiae – funky thistle
Cirsium gilense – Gila thistle
Cirsium grahamii – Graham's thistle
Cirsium griseum – gray thistle
Cirsium hallii – Hall's thistle
Cirsium helenioides – melancholy thistle, common melancholy thistle
Cirsium heterophyllum – melancholy thistle
Cirsium hillii – Hill's thistle
Cirsium hookerianum – white thistle
Cirsium horridulum – yellow thistle
Cirsium humboldtense – Humboldt County thistle
Cirsium hydrophilum – Suisun thistle
Cirsium hypoleucum
Cirsium inornatum – Cloudcroft thistle
Cirsium jaliscoense – G.L.Nesom
Cirsium japonicum – Japanese thistle
Cirsium kamtschaticum – Kamchatka thistle
Cirsium kawakamii – Yushan thistle
Cirsium lanatum – hairy thistle
Cirsium lanceolatum
Cirsium laterifolium – porcupine thistle
Cirsium lecontei – Le Conte's thistle
Cirsium leo
Cirsium libanoticum
Cirsium loncholepis – LaGraciosa thistle
Cirsium longistylum – longstyle thistle
Cirsium maritimum
Cirsium mendocinum – Mendocino thistle
Cirsium mexicanum – Mexican thistle
Cirsium modestum – lacy thistle
Cirsium mohavense – Mojave thistle
Cirsium murdockii – Murdock's thistle
Cirsium muticum – swamp thistle
Cirsium navajoense – Navajo thistle
Cirsium neomexicanum – lavender thistle, New Mexico thistle, powderpuff thistle
Cirsium nipponicum
Cirsium nuttallii – Nuttall's thistle
Cirsium occidentale – cobweb thistle
Cirsium ochrocentrum – yellowspine thistle
Cirsium oleraceum – cabbage thistle
Cirsium olivescens – summer thistle
Cirsium oreophilum – crow thistle
Cirsium osterhoutii – Osterhout's thistle
Cirsium ownbeyi – Ownbey's thistle
Cirsium pallidum – pale thistle
Cirsium palustre – marsh thistle, European swamp thistle
Cirsium parryi – Parry's thistle
Cirsium pastoris – snowy thistle
Cirsium peckii – Steens Mountain thistle
Cirsium pendulum
Cirsium perplexans – Rocky Mountain thistle
Cirsium pitcheri – Pitcher's thistle, sand dune thistle
Cirsium praeteriens – Palo Alto thistle, lost thistle
Cirsium proteanum – red thistle
Cirsium pulcherrimum – Wyoming thistle
Cirsium pumilum – pasture thistle
Cirsium pyrenaicum
Cirsium quercetorum – Alameda County thistle
Cirsium remotifolium – fewleaf thistle
Cirsium remotifolium var. remotifolium – fewleaf thistle
Cirsium repandum – sandhill thistle
Cirsium rhaphilepis
Cirsium rhinoceros – Korean prickly thistle
Cirsium rhothophilum – surf thistle
Cirsium rivulare
Cirsium rothrockii – Rothrock's thistle
Cirsium rusbyi – Rusby's thistle
Cirsium rydbergii – Rydberg's thistle
Cirsium scabrum – rough thistle
Cirsium scapanolepis – mountain slope thistle
Cirsium scariosum – meadow thistle
Cirsium scopulorum – mountain thistle
Cirsium segetum
Cirsium serrulatum
Cirsium setidens – gondre or Korean thistle
Cirsium spinosissimum
Cirsium subniveum – gray thistle, Jackson Hole thistle
Cirsium tanakae
Cirsium texanum – Texas thistle
Cirsium tioganum – stemless thistle
Cirsium tuberosum – tuberous thistle – similar to Cirsium dissectum (meadow thistle)
Cirsium turneri – cliff thistle
Cirsium undulatum – gray thistle, wavy-leaf thistle, wavyleaf thistle
Cirsium undulatum var. tracyi – Tracy's thistle, wavyleaf thistle
Cirsium undulatum var. undulatum – wavyleaf thistle
Cirsium validus – graceful thistle
Cirsium vernale – spring thistle
Cirsium vinaceum – Sacramento Mountain thistle, Sacramento Mountains thistle
Cirsium virginense – virgin thistle
Cirsium virginianum – Virginia thistle
Cirsium vulgare – bull thistle, spear thistle, common thistle, Fuller's thistle (syn. C. lanceolatum)
Cirsium wheeleri – Wheeler's thistle
Cirsium wrightii – Wright's thistle

Hybrids
Cirsium × canalense – canal thistle
Cirsium × crassum – thistle
Cirsium × erosum – glory thistle
Cirsium × iowense – Iowa thistle
Cirsium × vancouverense – Vancouver thistle

Image gallery

References

Further reading

  

 
Asteraceae genera
Taxa named by Philip Miller